Deborah Willows (born 29 March 1961 in London, Ontario) is a paralympic athlete from Canada competing mainly in category C1 events.

Career
Willows competed in the 1984 Summer Paralympics in athletics, boccia and swimming. Her best result came in swimming, winning a gold medal in the Women's 25 m Freestyle with Aids C1. Her other medals came when she won bronze in the women's C1 boccia, and in distance and precision throwing events, she won bronze and silver respectively. Willows also competed in the 1988 Summer Paralympics.

Awards and honours
Willows was inducted into the Canadian Cerebral Palsy Sports Association Hall of Fame in 2007.

References

1961 births
Living people
Paralympic track and field athletes of Canada
Paralympic boccia players of Canada
Paralympic swimmers of Canada
Paralympic gold medalists for Canada
Paralympic silver medalists for Canada
Paralympic bronze medalists for Canada
Paralympic medalists in boccia
Athletes (track and field) at the 1984 Summer Paralympics
Athletes (track and field) at the 1988 Summer Paralympics
Boccia players at the 1984 Summer Paralympics
Swimmers at the 1984 Summer Paralympics
Medalists at the 1984 Summer Paralympics
Athletes from London, Ontario
Swimmers from London, Ontario
Paralympic medalists in swimming
Paralympic medalists in athletics (track and field)
Canadian female freestyle swimmers